Raluca Ciochină (born 16 February 1983) is a Romanian former professional tennis player.

Born in Bucharest, Ciochină was the girls' 16-and-under Orange Bowl champion in 1999, also winning the doubles title.

From 2000 to 2002, she appeared in six Fed Cup ties for the Romania Fed Cup team.

Ciochină left the professional tour in 2002 to study and play college tennis at the University of Pennsylvania, before ultimately settling in the United States.

ITF finals

Singles (2–4)

Doubles (0–1)

References

External links
 
 
 

1983 births
Living people
Romanian female tennis players
Penn Quakers women's tennis players
Tennis players from Bucharest
Romanian emigrants to the United States